Oreonectes is a genus of fish in the family Nemacheilidae found in the rivers and caves of Asia. Many of these species are troglobitic.

Species
There are currently 15 recognized species in this genus:

 Oreonectes acridorsalis J. H. Lan, 2013  
 Oreonectes anophthalmus B. S. Zheng, 1981
 Oreonectes barbatus X. Gan, 2013 
 Oreonectes daqikongensis H. Q. Deng, H. M. Wen, N. Xiao & J. Zhou, 2016 
 Oreonectes donglanensis T. J. Wu, 2013 
 Oreonectes duanensis J. H. Lan, 2013 
 Oreonectes elongatus (L. Tang, Y. H. Zhao & C. G. Zhang, 2012) 
 Oreonectes furcocaudalis S. Q. Zhu & W. X. Cao, 1987
 Oreonectes guananensis Q. Yang, M. L. Wei, J. H. Lan & Q. Yang, 2011 
 Oreonectes luochengensis J. Yang, T. J. Wu, R. F. Wei & J. X. Yang, 2011 
 Oreonectes macrolepis A. M. Huang, L. N. Du, X. Y. Chen & J. X. Yang, 2009
 Oreonectes microphthalmus L. N. Du, X. Y. Chen & J. X. Yang, 2008
 Oreonectes platycephalus Günther, 1868 (flat-headed loach)
 Oreonectes polystigmus L. N. Du, X. Y. Chen & J. X. Yang, 2008
 Oreonectes retrodorsalis (J. H. Lan, J. X. Yang & Y. R. Chen, 1995)
 Oreonectes shuilongensis H. Q. Deng, N. Xiao, X. F. Hou & J. Zhou, 2016 
 Oreonectes translucens Z. L. Zhang, Y. H. Zhao & C. G. Zhang, 2006

References

 
Cypriniformes genera
Fish of Asia
Taxa named by Albert Günther
Taxonomy articles created by Polbot